Carex hyalina, the tissue sedge, is a species of sedge that was first described by Francis Boott in 1847.

References

hyalina
Plants described in 1847
Taxa named by Francis Boott